Cornea is a commune in Caraș-Severin County, western Romania with a population of 2,178 people. It is composed of four villages: Cornea, Crușovăț (Körtvélypatak), Cuptoare (Kuptorja) and Macoviște (Mákosfalva).

References

Communes in Caraș-Severin County
Localities in Romanian Banat